The V.B. Sochava Institute of Geography SB RAS is a scientific institution in the east of Russia, focusing on geographical studies.

The institute was established on November 29, 1957. In 2005, it was named after Viktor Borisovich Sochava to honor his distinguished career in national geography.

The prime mission of the institute is to conduct basic and applied research in the field of geographical science.

The goal of the institute is to conduct basic research in the field of landscape science, create the theoretical foundations for forecasting, monitoring and management of the geosystem dynamics and system mapping, and to develop the geographical framework for territorial organization of production, and population formation on the territory of Siberia.

Scientific schools
The institute has scientific schools on population geography, exogenous geomorphology, landscape hydrology, and landscape planning. An achievement of the institute is mapping of nature, the economy and population in regions of Asian Russia and neighboring countries. Cartographic products produced include the National Atlas of Mongolia, the atlases of the Transbaikalia KATEK and Lake Hovsgol, the Ecological Atlas of the Irkutsk Region, and thematic maps.

Applied geography
The research efforts focus on ecological zoning of the Baikal natural territory, assessment of natural resources and distribution of productive forces of the Siberian regions, and on optimization of the network of specially protected natural territories. The institute is engaged in the ecology of investment projects, among them the projects of development of oil and gas fields, and of the creation of pipelines to transfer hydrocarbon raw materials to countries of the Asian-Pacific region.

Conferences and lectures
Conferences are held of geographers of Siberia and the far East on and the Far East, on thematic cartography, landscape hydrology, assessment of potential natural resources, recreation geography, social geography, geoinformation and aerospace methods, and on modeling of geosystems, as well as scientific lectures in commemoration of Academician V.B. Sochava. The institute hosts the Bureau of Siberian organizations of the Russian Geographical Society as well as its East-Siberian Division that was established more than 150 years ago.

The V.B. Sochava Institute of Geography SB RAS website

References

Science and technology in Siberia
1957 establishments in Russia
Educational institutions established in 1957
Institutes of the Russian Academy of Sciences
Irkutsk
Research institutes in the Soviet Union